Lorenzo Sonego and Andrea Vavassori were the defending champions but only Vavassori chose to defend his title, partnering Julian Ocleppo. Vavassori lost in the first round to Laurynas Grigelis and Alessandro Motti.

Karol Drzewiecki and Szymon Walków won the title after defeating Marc-Andrea Hüsler and David Pel 7–6(12–10), 2–6, [11–9] in the final.

Seeds

Draw

References
 Main Draw

Internazionali di Tennis Castel del Monte - Doubles
2018 Doubles